Gidda barthelemyi is a species of beetle in the family Carabidae, the only species in the genus Gidda.

References

Lebiinae